Bhind Lok Sabha constituency is one of the 29 Lok Sabha constituencies in the Indian state of Madhya Pradesh. This constituency was reserved for the candidates belonging to the Scheduled castes in its first year as a stand-alone constituency, henceforth it became a general constituency. This constituency covers the entire Bhind and Datia districts.

Assembly segments

Presently, after delimitation, this constituency comprises the following eight Vidhan Sabha (legislative assembly) segments:

Before delimitation of parliamentary constituencies in 2008, Bhind Lok Sabha constituency comprised the following eight Vidhan Sabha (legislative assembly) segments:

Members of Parliament

Election results

See also
 Bhind district
 List of Constituencies of the Lok Sabha

References

Election Commission of India https://web.archive.org/web/20081218010942/http://www.eci.gov.in/StatisticalReports/ElectionStatistics.asp

Lok Sabha constituencies in Madhya Pradesh
Bhind district
Datia district